Mathura Lok Sabha constituency is one of the 80 Lok Sabha (parliamentary) constituencies in the Indian state of Uttar Pradesh. This constituency covers the entire Mathura district. According to Election Commission of India 2009 reports, the Mathura Parliamentary constituency (constituency number 17) has a total of 1,341,649 electorates out of which 593,726 are females and 747,923 are males.

Assembly Segments
Presently, Mathura Lok Sabha constituency comprises five Vidhan Sabha (legislative assembly) segments.

Members of Parliament

Election results

2019 Lok Sabha Election

2014 Lok Sabha Election

2009 results

2004 results

1999 results

1998 results

1996 Lok Sabha Election

1984 Lok Sabha Election
 Manvendra Singh (INC) : 263,248 votes   
 Gayatree Devi (LKD) : 159,848 votes. (Wife of former PM Charan Singh)

1957 Lok Sabha Election

See also
 Mathura district
 List of Constituencies of the Lok Sabha

References

Lok Sabha constituencies in Uttar Pradesh
Mathura district